Big Brother 2012 may refer to:

Big Brother Australia 2012
Big Brother 2012 (Denmark)
Big Brother 2012 (Sweden)
Big Brother 2012 (UK)
Big Brother 14 (U.S.)
Celebrity Big Brother 2012 (UK season 9)
Celebrity Big Brother 2012 (UK season 10)
Big Brother Brasil 12

2012 Swedish television seasons
DABs
2012 Australian television seasons
2012 British television seasons
2012 Brazilian television seasons
2012 Danish television seasons
2012 American television seasons